The Clarkston Main Post Office in Clarkston in Asotin County, Washington in southeast Washington is a historic post office building built in 1941.  It was listed on the National Register of Historic Places as U.S. Post Office – Clarkston Main in 1991.

Its design was credited to Supervising Architect Louis A. Simon.  It is a one-story, buff-colored brick building on a raised concrete basement.  It has a five-bay front facade.  It has an "ornate painted aluminum grille, in which a low-relief sculpted eagle is centered, is set in
front of the transom window" above the front door.

References

National Register of Historic Places in Asotin County, Washington
Colonial Revival architecture in Washington (state)
Streamline Moderne architecture in the United States
Government buildings completed in 1941
Buildings and structures in Asotin County, Washington
Post office buildings on the National Register of Historic Places in Washington (state)